In the Japanese language, aizuchi ( or) are interjections during a conversation that indicate the listener is paying attention or understands the speaker. In linguistic terms, these are a form of phatic expression. Aizuchi are considered reassuring to the speaker, indicating that the listener is active and involved in the discussion.

Examples
Common aizuchi include: 
 
 
 
 nodding
These have a similar function to English "yeah", "yup", "OK", "really?", "uh-huh", "oh", and so on.

Aizuchi are frequently misinterpreted by non-native speakers as the listener showing agreement and approval.

Aizuchi can also take the form of so-called echo questions, which consist of a noun plus . After Speaker A asks a question, Speaker B may repeat a key noun followed by desu ka to confirm what Speaker A was talking about or simply to keep communication open while Speaker B thinks of an answer. A rough English analog would be "A ..., you say?", as in: "So I bought this new car"; reply: "A car, you say?".

See also
 Backchannel (linguistics)

References

Further reading 
 Boye De Mente (2011). Japan's Cultural Code Words: 233 Key Terms That Explain the Attitudes and Behavior of the Japanese. Rutland, Vermont: Tuttle Publishing.

External links
The Japanese art of aizuchi
Japanese Conversational Interjections - What is Aizuchi?

Japanese honorifics
Pragmatics